Maharan Frozenfar (born November 17, 1966) is a former Israeli financial adviser to the chief of staff in the Israeli Defense Forces and former head of MOD budget directorate.

He served in a various financial and territorial roles within the army. He was promoted to brigadier general and later became the financial adviser to the 
chief of staff

Following the appointment  as the Financial Advisor to the Chief of Staff and the Head of the Ministry of Defense Budget directorate  , he carried out a number of reforms and promoted many mega-projects within the Israeli defense system.

greatly influenced the entire Israeli economy, including the following issues.

Established the budget corps within the IDF. The first officer to command the entire system of economists of the Israel Defense Forces, numbering many hundreds of officers of various ranks, deployed in all units.

Established the Military School of Budget and Economics in collaboration with Tel Aviv University, for high economic training.

Led the umbrella agreement between the IDF, the Ministry of Defense, the Ministry of Finance and the Israel Land Authority, to rebuild IDF camps in southern Israel and relocate them from the center, while improving technology and infrastructure.

Led the agreement for the civil planning of the vacant lands in central Israel for a change of use for residential, commercial, employment and other civil uses.

Managed the first mega project of the IDF and the Ministry of Defense using the BOT - PPP method for the construction, operation and maintenance for a period of 25 years, of the training campus that houses over 10,000 people at any given time.

Initiated and established the MEIMAD investment fund, together with the Ministry of Finance and the Chief Scientist of Israel, which specializes in providing financing to start-up companies that have innovative military and civilian technologies.

After his retirement, Maharan has founded M-Faculty, a strategic and financial consulting companyThe company provides strategic economic consulting services to companies, individuals and government ministries. Represents companies and individuals from foreign countries for investments and businesses in Israel.
Investors, through customer clubs, in land and real estate in Israel and around the world.
Experts in the development and increase of real estate value in Israel.
Provide services in Israel to most large government companies, to various government ministries, to public companies.
Experts in managing mega projects of infrastructure and projects in the execution method of PPP - BOT.

In July 2015 Maharan was appointed to be the chairman of an advisory committee to the minister of finance Moshe Kahlon.In his role as Chairman of the Advisory Committee to the Minister of Finance, he dealt extensively with the macroeconomics of the State of Israel, analyzing and presenting desirable development directions of the Israeli economy, participating in selecting strategic directions for managing the state budget and preparing long-term economic plans.
He served as chairman of the Advisory Committee to the Minister of Finance for more than four and a half years until 2019.

References

Brigadier generals
1966 births
Living people